("Let us raise"), WAB 44, is the last of eight settings of the hymn Tantum ergo composed by Anton Bruckner in .

History 
Bruckner composed the motet in  during his stay in St. Florian Abbey. The original manuscript is lost. An autograph voice score is stored in the archive of the abbey.

The motet was first published in band II/2, pp. 256–258 of the Göllerich/Auer biography.

Music 

The work of 29 bars in B-flat major, as edited in the current Gesamtausgabe, is scored for  choir, 2 violins, 2 trumpets and organ.

Discography 
There are only three recordings of this last setting of Tantum ergo:
 Richard Proulx, Cathedral Singers and Chamber Orchestra, Rediscoverd Masterpieces – CD: GIA 515, 1998
 Thomas Kerbl, Chorvereinigung Bruckner 09, Anton Bruckner Chöre/Klaviermusik – CD: LIVA 034, 2009
 Łukasz Borowicz, RIAS Kammerchor, Akademie für Alte Musik Berlin, Raphael Alpermann (Organ), Anton Bruckner – Missa solemnis –  CD: Accentus ACC 30429, 2017 (Cohrs edition)

References

Sources 
 August Göllerich, Anton Bruckner. Ein Lebens- und Schaffens-Bild,  – posthumous edited by Max Auer by G. Bosse, Regensburg, 1932
 Anton Bruckner – Sämtliche Werke, Band XXI: Kleine Kirchenmusikwerke, Musikwissenschaftlicher Verlag der Internationalen Bruckner-Gesellschaft, Hans Bauernfeind and Leopold Nowak (Editor), Vienna, 1984/2001
 Cornelis van Zwol, Anton Bruckner 1824–1896 – Leven en werken, uitg. Thoth, Bussum, Netherlands, 2012.

External links 
 
  
 Tantum ergo B-Dur, WAB 44 Critical discography by Hans Roelofs 

Motets by Anton Bruckner
1854 compositions
Compositions in B-flat major